Butler family may refer to:

 Butler dynasty, a noble family in Ireland
 Butler-Belmont family, a family of United States politicians
 Butler family (Artemis Fowl), a family in the Artemis Fowl teen novel series
 Butler (surname), people with the surname Butler